Ailesham cloth was a fine linen cloth made in England during middle ages.

History 
Ailesham cloth is a cloth of ancient times. Exeter Cathedral in 1327 had a towel of this cloth. Eylisham or Ailesham in Lincolnshire was famous during the fourteenth century  for linen manufacturing especially for the finer naperies.

See also 

 Napery

 Linen

References 

Linens